Conner Mantz (born 8 December 1996) is an American long-distance runner, who competes for Nike. He ran collegiately for Brigham Young University, and won the 2020 and 2021 NCAA Division I Cross Country Championships.

Professional 
Mantz represented the United States in the junior race at the 2015 IAAF World Cross Country Championships in Guiyang, China, placing 29th in 25:28 over 8 km. Mantz also led Team USA to a 6th place finish.

Shortly after turning professional in December 2021, Mantz won the USA Half Marathon Championships in Hardeeville, South Carolina with a time of 1:00:55.

March 20th, Mantz placed 5th at 2022 United Airlines NYC Half-Marathon in 1:01:40. 

Mantz debuted at the marathon distance, to finish 7th at the 2022 Chicago Marathon in 2:08:16 as the top American finisher.

National championships

Personal life
Mantz is from Cache County, Utah. He attended Sky View High School in Smithfield, Utah.

BYU

Sky View High School

External links
 
 Conner Mantz 2021 Training blog
 Conner Mantz Mormon Wiki
 
 Conner Mantz Profile Wanda Diamond League
 Conner Mantz Profile Strava
 Conner Mantz Cross Country profile BYU Cougars

References

1996 births
Living people
American male long-distance runners
BYU Cougars men's track and field athletes
BYU Cougars men's cross country runners
Sportspeople from Provo, Utah
People from Logan, Utah
Sportspeople from Logan, Utah